The 2018 Atlanta Braves season was the Braves' 53rd season in Atlanta, 148th overall, and second season at SunTrust Park. They completely reversed their 72-90 season in 2017, and made the postseason and won a division title for the first time since 2013. They lost to the Los Angeles Dodgers in four games in the NL Division Series.

Offseason

October

On October 2, 2017, John Coppolella resigned as general manager of the Braves amid a Major League Baseball investigation into Atlanta's international signings, having committed what the Braves termed "a breach of MLB rules regarding the international player market".

November
On November 13, 2017, the Braves announced Alex Anthopoulos as the new general manager and executive vice president. John Hart was removed as team president and assumed a senior adviser role with the organization. Braves chairman Terry McGuirk apologized to fans "on behalf of the entire Braves family" for the scandal. McGuirk described Anthopoulos as "a man of integrity" and that "he will operate in a way that will make all of our Braves fans proud." On November 17, 2017, the Braves announced that John Hart had stepped down as senior advisor for the organization.  Hart said in a statement that "with the hiring of Alex Anthopoulos as general manager, this organization is in great hands."

On November 21, 2017, Major League Baseball Commissioner Rob Manfred announced the findings of the MLB investigation into Atlanta's international signings. Manfred ruled that the Braves must forfeit 13 international prospects, including highly touted Kevin Maitan, an infielder from Venezuela who signed for $4.25 million in 2016. The team also forfeited a third-round draft pick in the 2018 draft. Former Braves general manager John Coppolella was placed on baseball's permanently ineligible list.

Additionally, the Braves shall be prohibited from signing any international player for more than $10,000 during the 2019–20 signing period and their international signing bonus pool for the 2020–21 signing period will be reduced by 50 percent.

December

The Braves traded outfielder Matt Kemp to the Los Angeles Dodgers for infielder Charlie Culberson, first baseman Adrián González and pitchers Scott Kazmir and Brandon McCarthy on December 16, 2017. The Braves released Adrián González a few days later.

Regular season

Game log

|-style="background:#bfb;"
| 1 || March 29 || Phillies || 8–5 || Vizcaíno (1–0) || Neris (0–1) || — || 40,208 || 1–0 || W1
|-style="background:#fbb;"
| 2 || March 30 || Phillies || 4–5 (11) || Hutchison (1–0) || Carle (0–1) || — || 35,123 || 1–1 || L1
|-style="background:#bfb;"
| 3 || March 31 || Phillies || 15–2 || McCarthy (1–0) || Velasquez (0–1) || — || 37,777 || 2–1 || W1
|-style="background:#fbb;"
| 4 || April 2 || Nationals|| 1–8 || Roark (1–0) || Newcomb (0–1) || — || 25,054 || 2–2 || L1
|-style="background:#bfb;"
| 5 || April 3 || Nationals || 13–6 || Carle (1–1) || Cole (0–1) || — || 26,782 || 3–2 || W1
|-style="background:#bfb;"
| 6 || April 4 || Nationals || 7–1 || Foltynewicz (1–0) || Scherzer (1–1) || — || 29,834 || 4–2 || W2
|-style="background:#bfb;"
| 7 || April 6 || @ Rockies || 8–3 || McCarthy (2–0) || Márquez (0–1) || — || 48,216 || 5–2 || W3
|-style="background:#fbb;"
| 8 || April 7 || @ Rockies || 2–3 (10) || Ottavino (2–0) || Vizcaíno (1–1) || — || 40,120 || 5–3 || L1
|-style="background:#bfb;"
| 9 || April 8 || @ Rockies || 4–0 || Newcomb (1–1) || Freeland (0–2) || — || 42,031 || 6–3 || W1
|-style="background:#fbb;"
| 10 || April 9 || @ Nationals || 0–2 || Scherzer (2–1) || Teherán (0–1) || — || 19,528 || 6–4 || L1
|-style="background:#fbb;"
| 11 || April 10 || @ Nationals || 1–4 || Strasburg (2–1) || Foltynewicz (1–1) || Madson (1) || 19,357 || 6–5 || L2
|-style="background:#bfb;"
| 12 || April 11 || @ Nationals || 5–3 (12) || Carle (2–1) || Madson (0–1) || — || 21,109 || 7–5 || W1
|-style="background:#bfb;"
| 13 || April 13 || @ Cubs || 4–0 || Sánchez (1–0) || Darvish (0–1) || — || 29,775 || 8–5 || W2
|-style=background:#fbb
| 14 || April 14 || @ Cubs || 10–14 || Wilson (1–0) || Ramirez (0–1) || — || 36,788 || 8–6 || L1
|-style=background:#bbb
| — ||April 15 || @ Cubs ||colspan=7|Postponed (rain); rescheduled for May 14
|-style="background:#bfb;"
| 15 || April 16 || Phillies || 2–1 || Teherán (1–1) || Nola (1–1) || Vizcaíno (1) || 17,812 || 9–6 || W1
|-style=background:#fbb
| 16 || April 17 || Phillies || 1–5 || Neris (1–1) || Ramirez (0–2) || — || 17,913 || 9–7 || L1
|-style=background:#bfb;"
| 17 || April 18 || Phillies || 7–3 || McCarthy (3–0) || Velasquez (1–2) || — || 22,135 || 10–7 || W1
|-style=background:#bfb;"
| 18 || April 19 || Mets || 12–4 || Wisler (1–0) || Harvey (0–2) || — || 23,610 ||11–7 || W2
|-style=background:#fbb;"
| 19 || April 20 || Mets || 3–5 (12) || Gsellman (2–0) || Ravin (0–1) || Familia (8) || 39,016 || 11–8 || L1
|-style=background:#bfb;"
| 20 || April 21 || Mets || 4–3 || Biddle (1–0) || Familia (1–1) || — || 41,396 || 12–8 || W1
|-style=background:#bbb;"
| — || April 22 || Mets ||colspan=7|Postponed (rain); rescheduled for May 28
|-style=background:#fbb
| 21 || April 23 || @ Reds || 4–10 || Romano (1–2) || Freeman (0–1) || Iglesias (3) || 9,463 || 12–9 || L1
|-style=background:#fbb
| 22 || April 24 || @ Reds || 7–9 (12) || Hughes (1–2) || Fried (0–1) || — || 14,139 || 12–10 || L2
|-style=background:#bfb
| 23 || April 25 || @ Reds || 4–3 || Winkler (1–0) || Shackelford (0–1) || Minter (1) || 13,113 || 13–10 || W1
|-style=background:#bfb
| 24 || April 26 || @ Reds || 7–4 || Freeman (1–1) || Peralta (1–1) || Vizcaíno (2) || 11,919  || 14–10 || W2
|-style=background:#fbb
| 25 || April 27 || @ Phillies || 3–7 || Nola (3–1) || Fried (0–2) || — || 27,076 || 14–11 || L1
|-style=background:#bfb
| 26 || April 28 || @ Phillies || 4–1 || Foltynewicz (2–1)  || Pivetta (1–1) || Vizcaíno (3) || 27,794 || 15–11 || W1
|-style=background:#bfb
| 27 || April 29 || @ Phillies || 10–1 || McCarthy (4–0) ||  Velasquez (1–4) || — || 31,010 || 16–11 || W2
|-

|- style=background:#fbb;
|-style=background:#bfb
| 28 || May 1 || @ Mets || 3–2 || Soroka (1–0) || Syndergaard (2–1) || Vizcaíno (4) || 22,527 || 17–11 || W3
|-style=background:#bfb
| 29 || May 2 || @ Mets || 7–0 || Newcomb (2–1) || Sewald (0–2) || — || 23,528 || 18–11 || W4
|-style=background:#bfb
| 30 || May 3|| @ Mets || 11–0 || Teherán (2–1) ||Vargas (0–2) || — || 26,882 || 19–11 ||W5
|-style=background:#fbb
| 31 || May 4|| Giants || 4–9 || Stratton (3–2) || Foltynewicz (2–2) || — || 41,807 || 19–12 || L1
|-style=background:#fbb
| 32 || May 5|| Giants || 2–11 || Blach (3–3) || McCarthy (4–1) || — || 38,264 || 19–13 || L2
|-style=background:#fbb
| 33 || May 6|| Giants || 3–4 || Suárez (1–1) || Soroka (1–1) || Strickland (8) || 37,896 || 19–14 || L3
|-style=background:#bfb
| 34 || May 8|| @ Rays  || 1–0 || Newcomb (3–1) || Snell (4–2) || Vizcaíno (5) || 15,382 || 20–14 || W1
|-style=background:#bfb
| 35 || May 9|| @ Rays || 5–2 || Teherán (3–1) || Yarbrough (2–2) || Vizcaíno (6) || 12,082 || 21–14 || W2
|-style=background:#bfb
| 36 || May 10|| @ Marlins ||9–2||Foltynewicz (3–2)||Smith (2–4)||Gohara (1)||8,277||22–14||W3
|-style=background:#fbb
| 37 || May 11|| @ Marlins ||3–6||Straily (1–0)||McCarthy (4–2)||Ziegler (5)||9,149||22–15||L1
|-style=background:#bfb
| 38 || May 12|| @ Marlins || 10–5 || Minter (1–0) || Steckenrider (1–1)  || — || 12,383 || 23–15 || W1
|-style=background:#bfb
| 39 || May 13|| @ Marlins || 4–3 || Newcomb (4–1) ||Ureña (0–6) || Vizcaíno (7)||7,435 || 24–15 ||W2
|-style="background:#bfb
| 40 || May 14 || @ Cubs || 6–5 || Teherán (4–1) || Quintana (4–3) || Minter (2) || 35,946 || 25–15 || W3
|-style=background:#fbb
| 41 || May 15|| Cubs || 2–3 || Edwards Jr. (2–0) || Vizcaíno (1–2) || Morrow (10) || 34,452 || 25–16 || L1
|-style=background:#bfb
| 42 || May 16|| Cubs || 4–1 || Minter (2–0) || Edwards Jr. (2–1) || Vizcaíno (8) || 28,264 || 26–16 || W1
|-style=background:#bbb
| — || May 17|| Cubs || colspan=7|Postponed (rain); rescheduled for August 30
|-style=background:#fbb
| 43 || May 18|| Marlins || 0–2 || Straily (2–0) || Wisler (1–1) || Ziegler (8) || 27,705 || 26–17 || L1
|-style=background:#bfb
| 44 || May 19|| Marlins || 8–1 || Newcomb (5–1) || Ureña (0–7) || — || 37,715 || 27–17 || W1
|-style=background:#bfb
| 45 || May 20|| Marlins || 10–9 || Minter (3–0) || Guerrero (0–2) || — || 28,352 || 28–17 || W2
|-style=background:#fbb
| 46 || May 21|| @ Phillies || 0–3 || Pivetta (4–2) || Foltynewicz (3–3) || Neris (9) || 21,284 || 28–18 || L1
|-style=background:#bfb
| 47 || May 22|| @ Phillies || 3–1 || McCarthy (5–2) || Velasquez (4–5) || Vizcaíno (9) || 18,545 || 29–18 || W1
|-style=background:#fbb
| 48 || May 23|| @ Phillies || 0–4 || Arrieta (4–2) || Gohara (0–1) || — || 27,647 || 29–19 || L1
|-style=background:#fbb
| 49 || May 25 || @ Red Sox || 2–6 || Rodríguez (5–1) || Teherán (4–2) || — || 37,008 || 29–20 || L2
|-style=background:#fbb
| 50 || May 26 || @ Red Sox || 6–8 || Wright (1–0) || Freeman (1–2) || Kimbrel (16) || 36,510 || 29–21 || L3
|-style=background:#bfb
| 51 || May 27 || @ Red Sox || 7–1 || Foltynewicz (4–3) || Sale (5–2) || — || 36,543 || 30–21 || W1
|-style=background:#bfb
| 52 || May 28 (1) || Mets || 4–3 || Carle (3–1) || Lugo (1–1) || — || 32,377 || 31–21 || W2
|-style=background:#fbb
| 53 || May 28 (2) || Mets || 5–8 || Gsellman (5-1) || Minter (3-1) || Familia (14) || 31,779 || 31–22 || L1
|-style=background:#bfb
| 54 || May 29 || Mets || 7–6 || Winkler (2–0) || Bautista (0–1) || — || 19,443 || 32–22 || W1
|-style=background:#fbb
| 55 || May 30 || Mets || 1–4 || Vargas (2–3) || Teherán (4–3) || Gsellman (2) || 21,449 || 32–23 || L1
|-style=background:#bfb
| 56 || May 31 || Nationals || 4–2 || Newcomb (6–1) || Roark (2–5) || Vizcaíno (10)|| 22,380 || 33–23 || W1
|-

|- style=background:#fbb;
|- style=background:#bfb
| 57 || June 1 || Nationals || 4–0 || Foltynewicz (5–3) || Strasburg (6–5) || — || 33,845 || 34–23 || W2
|-style=background:#fbb
| 58 || June 2 || Nationals || 3–5 (14) || Miller (2–0) || Socolovich (0–1) || Doolittle (14) || 39,578 || 34–24 || L1
|-style=background:#bfb
| 59 || June 3 || Nationals || 4–2 || Vizcaíno (2–2) || Roark (2–6) || – || 33,132 || 35–24 || W1
|-style=background:#fbb
| 60 || June 4 || @ Padres || 4–11 || Richard (4–6) || Teherán (4–4) || — || 19,419 || 35–25 || L1
|-style=background:#bfb
| 61 || June 5 || @ Padres || 14–1 || Newcomb (7–1) || Lyles (2–2) || Jackson (1) || 21,049 || 36–25 || W1
|-style=background:#fbb
| 62 || June 6 || @ Padres || 1–3 || Castillo (1–0) || Foltynewicz (5–4) || Hand (18) || 20,898 || 36–26 || L1
|-style=background:#fbb
| 63 || June 8 || @ Dodgers || 3–7 || Buehler (4–1) || McCarthy (5–3) || — || 47,262 || 36–27 || L2
|-style=background:#bfb
| 64 || June 9 || @ Dodgers || 5–3 || Sánchez (2–0) || Wood (1–5) || Vizcaíno (11) || 52,718 || 37–27 || W1
|-style=background:#fbb
| 65 || June 10 || @ Dodgers || 2–7 || Stripling (5–1) || Newcomb (7–2) || — || 47,711 || 37–28 || L1
|-style=background:#bfb
| 66 || June 12 || Mets || 8–2 || Carle (4–1) || Wheeler (2–5) || — || 29,892 || 38–28 || W1
|-style=background:#bfb
| 67 || June 13 || Mets || 2–0 || Soroka (2–1) || deGrom (4–2) || Vizcaíno (12) || 32,015 || 39–28 || W2
|-style=background:#bfb
| 68 || June 14 || Padres || 4–2 || Sánchez (3–0) || Ross (5–4) || Vizcaíno (13) || 25,250 || 40–28 || W3
|-style=background:#fbb
| 69 || June 15 || Padres || 3–9 || Richard (6–6)|| Freeman (1–3) || — || 41,497|| 40–29 ||L1
|-style=background:#bfb
| 70 || June 16 || Padres || 1–0 || Newcomb (8–2)||Lyles (2–4) ||  Vizcaíno (14)|| 41,916 || 41–29 ||W1
|-style=background:#bfb
| 71 || June 17 || Padres || 4–1 ||Teherán (5–4) || Castillo (1–1) || Vizcaíno  (15)|| 40,251|| 42–29 || W2
|-style=background:#bfb
| 72 || June 19 || @ Blue Jays || 11–4 || Freeman (2–3) || García (2–6) || — || 32,466 || 43–29 || W3
|-style=background:#fbb
| 73 || June 20 || @ Blue Jays || 4–5 || Happ (9–3) || Sánchez (3–1) || Tepera (5)  || 45,563 || 43–30 || L1
|-style=background:#fbb
| 74 || June 22 || Orioles || 7–10 (15) || Wright (1–0) || Moylan (0–1) || — || 37,192 || 43–31 || L2
|-style=background:#fbb
| 75 || June 23 || Orioles || 5–7 || Bundy (6–7) || Teherán (5–5) || Britton (1) || 40,333 || 43–32 || L3
|-style=background:#bfb
| 76 || June 24 || Orioles || 7–3 || McCarthy (6–3) || Hess (2–4) || — || 33,794 || 44–32 || W1
|-style=background:#bfb
| 77 || June 25 || Reds || 5–4 (11) || Jackson (1–0) || Floro (2–2) || — || 27,851 || 45–32 || W2
|-style=background:#fbb
| 78 || June 26 || Reds || 3–5 || Harvey (3–5) || Sánchez (3–2) || Iglesias (14) || 28,356 || 45–33 || L1
|-style=background:#fbb
| 79 || June 27 || Reds || 5–6 || Stephens (2–0) || Freeman (2–4) || Iglesias (15) || 30,207 || 45–34 || L2
|-style=background:#bfb
| 80 || June 29 || @ Cardinals || 5–1 || Teherán (6–5) || Mikolas (8–3) || Winkler (1) || 46,226 || 46–34 || W1
|-style=background:#bfb
| 81 || June 30 || @ Cardinals || 11–4 || Fried (1–2) || Weaver (4–7) || — || 46,667 || 47–34 || W2
|-

|- style=background:#fbb;
|-style=background:#bfb
| 82 || July 1 || @ Cardinals || 6–5 || Foltynewicz (6–4) || Gant (2–3) || Minter (3) || 46,448 || 48–34 || W3
|-style=background:#bfb
| 83 || July 2 || @ Yankees || 5–3 (11) || Biddle (2–0) || Robertson (5–3) || Minter (4) || 43,792 || 49–34 || W4
|-style=background:#fbb
| 84 || July 3 || @ Yankees || 5–8 || Cole (3–1) || Newcomb (8–3) || Chapman (24)  || 45,448 || 49–35 || L1
|-style=background:#fbb
| 85 || July 4 || @ Yankees || 2–6 || Sabathia (6–3) || Teherán (6–6) || — || 46,658 || 49–36 || L2
|-style=background:#fbb
| 86 || July 5 || @ Brewers || 2–7 || Chacín (7–3) || Fried (1–3) || Jennings (1) || 27,557 || 49–37 || L3
|-style=background:#fbb
| 87 || July 6 || @ Brewers || 4–5 || Peralta (4–1) || Foltynewicz (6–5) || Knebel (11) || 31,452 || 49–38 || L4
|-style=background:#bfb
| 88 || July 7 || @ Brewers || 5–1 || Sánchez (4–2) || Wilkerson (0–1) || — || 38,813 || 50–38 || W1
|-style=background:#fbb
| 89 || July 8 || @ Brewers || 3–10 || Guerra (6–5) || Newcomb (8–4) || — || 43,262 || 50–39 || L1
|-style=background:#fbb
| 90 || July 10 || Blue Jays || 2–6 || Stroman (2–6) || Minter (3–2) || — || 31,747 || 50–40 || L2
|-style=background:#bfb
| 91 || July 11 || Blue Jays || 9–5 || Foltynewicz (7–5) || Gaviglio (2–3) || — || 27,839 || 51–40 || W1
|-style=background:#fbb
| 92 || July 13 || Diamondbacks || 1-2 || Godley (11–6) || Freeman (2–5) || Boxberger (23) || 42,130 || 51-41 || L1
|-style=background:#fbb
| 93 || July 14 || Diamondbacks || 0-3 || Greinke (10–5) || Newcomb (8–5) || Boxberger (24) || 40,862 || 51-42 || L2
|-style=background:#bfb
| 94 || July 15 || Diamondbacks || 5-1 || Teherán (7–6) || Corbin (6–4) || — || 27,323 || 52-42 || W1
|-style="text-align:center; background:#bbcaff;"
|colspan="10"|89th All-Star Game in Washington, D.C.
|-style=background:#bfb
| 95 || July 20 || @ Nationals || 8–5 || Sánchez (5–2) || Strasburg (6–7) || Minter (5) || 41,008 || 53-42 ||  W2
|-style=background:#bbb
| — || July 21 || @ Nationals ||colspan=7|Postponed (rain); Rescheduled for August 7 as part of a doubleheader.
|-style=background:#fbb
| 96 || July 22 || @ Nationals || 2–6 || Scherzer (13–5) || Foltynewicz (7–6) || Herrera (15) || 39,063 || 53-43 ||  L1
|-style=background:#bfb
| 97 || July 23 || @ Marlins || 12–1 || Newcomb (9–5) || Ureña (2–10) ||—|| 8.259 || 54–43 || W1
|-style=background:#fbb
| 98 || July 24 || @ Marlins || 3–9 || Chen (3–7) || Teherán (7–7) ||—|| 21,673 || 54–44 || L1
|-style=background:#fbb
| 99 || July 26 || Dodgers || 2–8 || Hill (4–4)  || Sánchez (5–3)  || — || 40,706 || 54–45 || L2
|-style=background:#fbb
| 100 || July 27 || Dodgers || 1–4|| Kershaw (4–5) ||Foltynewicz (7–7)|| Jansen (30) || 41,647 || 54–46 ||L3
|-style=background:#fbb
| 101 || July 28 || Dodgers || 1—5 || Wood (7–5) || Fried (1–4) || – || 41, 758 || 54–47 ||L4
|-style=background:#bfb
| 102 || July 29 || Dodgers || 4–1 || Newcomb (10–5)  || Stirpling (8–3) || — || 40,303 || 55–47 ||W1
|-style=background:#bfb
| 103 || July 30 || Marlins || 5–3 ||Teherán (8–7) || Chen (3–8) || Minter (6) || 21,230 || 56–47 || W2
|-style=background:#bfb
| 104 || July 31 || Marlins || 11–6 ||Allard (1–0) || Straily (4–5)|| — || 18,627 || 57–47 ||W3
|-

|- style=background:#fbb;
|-style=background:#bbb
| — || August 1 || Marlins ||colspan=7|Postponed (rain); Rescheduled for August 13 as part of a doubleheader.
|-style=background:#fbb
|-style=background:#bfb
| 105 || August 2 || @ Mets || 4–2 ||Foltynewicz (8–7) ||Vargas (2–7)|| Minter (7) || 24,525 || 58–47 ||W4
|-style=background:#bfb
| 106 || August 3 || @ Mets ||2–1 ||Sánchez (6–3)|| deGrom (5–7) || Minter (8) || 25,101 || 59–47 ||W5
|-style=background:#fbb
| 107 || August 4 || @ Mets ||0–3 || Wheeler (6–6) ||Gausman (5–9)  || Gsellman (6) || 36,946 || 59–48 ||L1
|-style=background:#bfb
| 108 || August 5 || @ Mets ||5–4 || Minter (4–5)||Bashlor (0–1)|| Biddle (1) || 27,134 || 60–48 || W1
|-style=background:#fbb
| 109 || August 7 (1) || @ Nationals || 3–8 || Rodríguez (1–0) || Allard (1–1) || — || 26,965 || 60–49 || L1
|-style=background:#bfb
| 110 || August 7 (2) || @ Nationals || 3–1 || Biddle (3–0) || Herrera (2–3) || Minter (9) || 28,970 || 61–49 || W1
|-style=background:#bfb
| 111 || August 8 || @ Nationals || 8–3 || Foltynewicz (9–7) || Milone (1–1)|| — || 30,203 || 62–49 || W2
|-style=background:#fbb
| 112 || August 9 || @ Nationals || 3–6 || González (7–8) || Parsons (0–1)|| — || 28,347 || 62–50 || L1
|-style=background:#bfb
| 113 || August 10 || Brewers || 10–1||Gausman (6–9)|| Peralta (5–3) || — ||36,519 ||63–50 ||W1
|-style=background:#fbb
| 114 || August 11 || Brewers ||2–4 ||Burnes (3–0) ||Biddle (3–1) || Hader (9) ||40,297 ||63–51 ||L1
|-style=background:#bfb
| 115 || August 12 || Brewers || 8–7 ||Venters (2–1) ||Jennings (4–4) ||Minter (10) ||25,360 ||64–51 ||W1
|-style=background:#bfb
| 116 || August 13 (1) || Marlins || 9–1 || Toussaint (1–0) ||López (2–3) || — ||16,049 ||65–51 || W2
|-style=background:#bfb
| 117 || August 13 (2) || Marlins || 6–1 || Foltynewicz (10–7) || González (2–1) || — || 18,186 || 66–51 || W3
|-style=background:#bfb
| 118 || August 14 || Marlins || 10–6 || Biddle (4–1) || Conley (3–3) || — || 19,409 || 67–51 || W4
|-style=background:#bfb
| 119 || August 15 || Marlins || 5-2 || Gausman (7–9)|| García (1-2)||Minter (11) || 19,045 ||68-51 ||W5
|-style=background:#fbb
| 120 || August 16 || Rockies || 3-5 || Oh (5–3) || Brach (1–3)|| Davis (33) || 23,428 || 68-52 ||L1
|-style=background:#fbb
| 121 || August 17 || Rockies || 5-11 || Freeland (11–7) || Newcomb (10–6) || — || 28,964 || 68-53 ||L2
|-style=background:#fbb
| 122 || August 18 || Rockies || 3-5 (10)|| Ottavino (5–2) || Jackson (1–1)|| Davis (34) || 42,143 || 68-54 ||L3
|-style=background:#fbb
| 123 || August 19 || Rockies || 2-4 || Márquez (11–9) || Sánchez (6–4)|| Davis (35) || 33,942|| 68-55||L4
|-style=background:#bfb
| 124 || August 20 || @ Pirates || 1-0 ||Wilson (1–0) ||Archer (4–6) || Winkler (2) || 16,445|| 69-55||W1
|-style=background:#bfb
| 125 || August 21 || @ Pirates || 6-1 ||Gausman (8–9) ||Nova (7–8) || — || 13,280 ||70-55 ||W2
|-style=background:#bfb
| 126 || August 22 || @ Pirates || 2-1 ||Teherán (9–7) ||Crick (2–2) ||Venters (2) || 14,249 ||71-55 || W3
|-style=background:#bfb
| 127 || August 23 || @ Marlins || 5-0 ||Newcomb (11–6) ||Hernandez (2–7) || — || 6,587 ||72-55 || W4
|-style=background:#fbb
| 128 || August 24 || @ Marlins || 0-1 ||Straily (5–6) ||Foltynewicz (10–8) ||Conley (2) ||7,792 ||72-56 ||L1
|-style=background:#fbb
| 129 || August 25 || @ Marlins || 1-3 ||Chen (5–9) ||Sánchez (6–5) || Steckenrider (2) ||7,823 ||72-57 ||L2
|-style=background:#bfb
| 130 || August 26 || @ Marlins || 4-0 ||Gausman (9–9) ||López (2–4) || — ||12,770 ||73-57 ||W1
|-style=background:#bfb
| 131 || August 28 || Rays || 9-5 ||Brach (2–3) ||Roe (1–3) || — ||21,216 ||74-57 ||W2
|-style=background:#fbb
| 132 || August 29 || Rays || 5-8 ||Beeks (4–1) ||Newcomb (11–7) || Alvarado (6) ||20,876 ||74-58 ||L1
|-style=background:#fbb
| 133 || August 30 || Cubs || 4-5 ||Kintzler (2–3) ||Foltynewicz (10–9) || Strop (11) ||37,603 ||74-59 ||L2
|-style=background:#fbb
| 134 || August 31 || Pirates || 2-3 ||Taillon (11–9) ||Brach (2–4) ||Vázquez (29) ||36,650 ||74-60 ||L3 
|-

|- style=background:#fbb;
|- style=background:#bfb
| 135 || September 1 || Pirates || 5–3 ||Venters (3–1) ||Kela (3–4) ||Minter (12) ||33,705 ||75–60 ||W1 
|-style=background:#bfb 
| 136 || September 2 || Pirates || 5–1 ||Venters (4–1) ||Brault (3–1) || — ||37,475 ||76–60 ||W2
|-style=background:#fbb
| 137 || September 3 || Red Sox || 2–8 ||Workman (3–0) ||Toussaint (1–1) || — ||40,394 ||76–61 ||L1
|-style=background:#fbb
| 138 || September 4 || Red Sox || 1–5 ||Porcello (16–7)  || Newcomb (11–8)|| — || 35,333 || 76–62 || L2
|-style=background:#fbb
| 139 || September 5 || Red Sox || 8–9 ||Workman (4–0) ||Minter (4–3) || Kimbrel (38) || 28,386 || 76–63 || L3
|-style=background:#bfb
| 140 || September 6 || @ Diamondbacks || 7–6 (10) || Biddle (5–1) || Boxberger (2–6) || Brach (12) || 21,903||77–63 || W1
|-style=background:#fbb
| 141 || September 7 || @ Diamondbacks || 3–5 || Corbin (11–5) || Gausman (9–10) || Boxberger(32) || 31,308 || 77–64 || L1
|-style=background:#bfb
| 142 || September 8 || @ Diamondbacks || 5–4 (10) || Sobotka (1–0) || Chafin (1–5) || Minter (13) || 40,482 || 78–64 || W1
|-style=background:#bfb
| 143 || September 9 || @ Diamondbacks || 9–5 || Freeman (3–5) || Boxberger (2–7) || — || 28,339 || 79–64 || W2
|-style=background:#bfb
| 144 || September 10 || @ Giants || 4–1 || Newcomb (12–8) || Rodríguez (6–3) || Minter (14) || 35,996 || 80–64|| W3
|-style=background:#bfb
| 145 || September 11 || @ Giants || 4–1 || Foltynewicz (11-9) || Suarez (6–11) || — || 35,285 || 81–64 || W4 
|-style=background:#bfb
| 146 || September 12 || @ Giants || 2–1 ||Winkler (3-0)  ||Smith (2-3)  || Venters (3) || 38,156 || 82–64 || W5 
|-style=background:#bfb
| 147 || September 14 || Nationals || 10–5 || Gausman (10–10) || Scherzer (17–7) || — || 39,268 || 83–64 || W6
|-style=background:#fbb
| 148 || September 15 || Nationals || 1–7 || Rodríguez (3–2) || Teherán (9–8) || — || 36,050 || 83–65 || L1
|-style=background:#fbb
| 149 || September 16 || Nationals || 4–6 || Roark (9–15) || Newcomb (12–9) || Doolittle (24) || 33,403 || 83–66 || L2
|-style=background:#fbb
| 150 || September 17 || Cardinals || 6–11 || Mikolas (16–4) || Foltynewicz (11–10) || — || 24,304 || 83–67 || L3
|-style=background:#fbb
| 151 || September 18 || Cardinals || 1–8 || Gomber (6–1) || Sánchez (6–6) || — || 23,083 || 83–68 || L4
|-style=background:#bfb
| 152 || September 19 || Cardinals || 7–3 || Toussaint (2–1) || Flaherty (8–8) || — || 25,195 || 84–68 || W1
|-style=background:#bfb
| 153 || September 20 || Phillies || 8–3 || Biddle (6–1) || Hunter (4–4) || — || 27,474 || 85–68 || W2
|-style=background:#bfb
| 154 || September 21 || Phillies || 6–5 || Venters (5–1) || Neshek (3–2) || Minter (15) || 34,370 || 86–68 || W3 
|-style=background:#bfb
| 155 || September 22 || Phillies || 5–3 || Foltynewicz (12-10) || Arrieta (10-10) || Vizcaino (16) || 35,616 || 87–68 || W4
|-style=background:#bfb
| 156 || September 23 || Phillies || 2–1 || Sánchez (7-6) || Nola (16-6) || Carle (1) || 34,214 || 88–68 || W5
|-style=background:#bfb
| 157 || September 25 || @ Mets || 7–3 || Winkler (4–0) || Gsellman (6–3) || — || 21,943 || 89–68 || W6
|-style=background:#fbb 
| 158 || September 26 || @ Mets || 0–3 || deGrom (10–9) || Jackson (1–2) || Lugo (3)  || 23,205 || 89–69 || L1
|-style=background:#fbb
| 159 || September 27 || @ Mets || 1–4 || Vargas (7–2)|| Teherán (9–9) || Gsellman (13) || 24,824 || 89–70 || L2
|-style=background:#bfb
| 160 || September 28 || @ Phillies || 10–2 || Foltynewicz (13–10) || Eickhoff (0–1) || — || 24,306 || 90–70 || W1
|-style=background:#fbb
| 161 || September 29 || @ Phillies || 0–3 || Nola (17–6) || Venters (5–2) || Domínguez (15) || 30,886 || 90–71 || L1
|-style=background:#fbb
| 162 || September 30 || @ Phillies || 1–3 || Hunter (5–4) || Gausman (10–11) || Domínguez (16) || 34,202 || 90–72 || L2
|-

|-
| Legend:       = Win       = Loss       = PostponementBold = Braves team member

Season standings

National League East

National League Wild Card

Record vs. opponents

Postseason

Game log

|-style=background:#fbb
| 1 || October 4 || @ Dodgers || 0–6 || Ryu (1–0)|| Foltynewicz (0–1)|| — ||59,947 || 0–1
|-style=background:#fbb
| 2 || October 5 || @ Dodgers || 0–3 || Kershaw (1–0)||Sánchez (0–1) || Jansen (1) || 54,452|| 0–2
|-style=background:#cfc
| 3 || October 7 || Dodgers || 6–5 ||Toussaint (1–0) ||Wood (0–1) || Vizcaíno (1) || 42,385|| 1–2
|-style=background:#fbb
| 4 || October 8 || Dodgers || 2–6 || Madson (1–0)||Venters (0–1) || — ||39,586 || 1–3
|-

Postseason rosters

| style="text-align:left" |
Pitchers: 15 Sean Newcomb 19 Aníbal Sánchez 26 Mike Foltynewicz 33 A. J. Minter 38 Arodys Vizcaíno 45 Kevin Gausman 46 Brad Brach 48 Jonny Venters 49 Julio Teherán 54 Max Fried 61 Chad Sobotka 62 Touki Toussaint 
Catchers: 12 René Rivera 24 Kurt Suzuki 25 Tyler Flowers 
Infielders: 1 Ozzie Albies 5 Freddie Freeman 16 Charlie Culberson 17 Johan Camargo 20 Lucas Duda 27 Ryan Flaherty
Outfielders: 11 Ender Inciarte 13 Ronald Acuña Jr. 18 Lane Adams 22 Nick Markakis  
|- valign="top"

Roster

Statistics

Source:

Batting

Players in bold are on the active MLB roster as of the 2022 season.

Note: G = Games played; AB = At bats; R = Runs; H = Hits; 2B = Doubles; 3B = Triples; HR = Home runs; RBI = Runs batted in; AVG = Batting average; OBP = On-base percentage; SLG = Slugging percentage; SB = Stolen bases

Pitching

Source:

Players in bold are on the active MLB roster as of 2022.Note: W = Wins; L = Losses; ERA = Earned run average; G = Games pitched; GS = Games started; SV = Saves; IP = Innings pitched; H = Hits allowed; R = Runs allowed; ER = Earned runs allowed; HR = Home runs allowed; BB = Walks allowed; K = StrikeoutsFarm system

References

External links
2018 Atlanta Braves season at Baseball Reference''

Atlanta Braves seasons
Atlanta Braves
Atlanta Braves
National League East champion seasons